Indira Road is the name of a road adjoining the Farmgate area of Dhaka city.

Many people think that name of this familiar road came from the name of Indira Gandhi, but it has no evidence. There are another concept about the naming of the road. In that area a wealthy person named Dwijdas Babu lived who was head of Manipur firm. His eldest daughter named Indira died. Her body was buried inside of their own house. People think that the road was named after his daughter.

The road is under Dhaka North City Corporation and Tejgaon Thana. Tejgaon College is situated in the road. The government's Indira Road-Panthapath link road project is underway.

References

Streets in Dhaka